Ishvinder ‘Baba’ Maddh is an Austro-Indian entrepreneur. Since 2009, he has been representing Central and Eastern European countries in India, and his focus is to increase outbound tourism from India into these countries. He has led Indian film and television production houses for production in Austria. His notable work includes Service Production of Indian Films like Saaho, Tiger Zinda Hai, Ae Dil Hai Mushkil, and TV show Pardes Mein Hai Mera Dil in Austria.

Early life and career 
Ishvinder was born and raised in Vienna, Austria. He began his career in the aviation industry working with Austrian Airlines and Lauda Air in Vienna. Since 2007 he lives in New Delhi, India. In 2009 he incorporated Robinville Intech Pvt Ltd which is currently headquartered in New Delhi. Under his guidance the firm ventured in tourism and film productions. His other ventures include an advisory firm, Georgetown Advisory Partners. Ishvinder is an early investor in Bollyshake.com and serves as a guest lecturer in MCI Management Center Innsbruck.

Film productions 
Ishvinder represents film commissions like Location Austria, Cine Tirol, Scandinavian Locations in India. Over the years has facilitated many Indian film & TV productions in Austria including Yash Raj Films, Dharma Productions, UV Creations, and Balaji Telefilms.

Bollywood Meets Austria 
In 2018, his firm Robinville Intech Pvt Ltd along with Austrian Economic Chamber organised "Bollywood Meets Austria" where six Indian producers explored Austria from 9 to 15 September 2018.  An highlight of the  trip was the signing of a Memorandum of Understanding between the Indian "Film & Television Producers Guild", Austrian Economic Chamber and Location Austria 10 September 2018,  to intensify the existing cooperation between the federal states. This event was given the  EVA-Event-Award as "Best Newcomer Event" in 2018.

Awards 
In May 2019, he received the TAI - Werbe Grand Prix 2018/19 award for "Bollywood Meets Austria" Campaign and Robinville Intech Pvt Ltd's contribution for promoting Austria as a destination for Bollywood Film Production.

References 

1978 births
Living people
Businesspeople from Vienna
Businesspeople from Delhi